Roland Carl Backhouse (born 18 August 1948) is a British computer scientist and mathematician. , he is Emeritus Professor of Computing Science at the University of Nottingham.

Early life and education
Backhouse was born and raised in the Thorntree district of Middlesbrough, an industrial town in the north-east of England. In 1959, he won a place at the then all-male Acklam Hall Grammar School before going on to Churchill College, Cambridge, in 1966. His doctorate (Ph.D.) was completed under the supervision of Jim Cunningham at Imperial College London.

Career
Backhouse's career has included Royal Aircraft Establishment (1969–1970), Heriot-Watt University (1973–1982), University of Essex (1982–1986). He was formerly Professor of Computer Science at the University of Groningen (1986–1990) and Eindhoven University of Technology (1990–1999) in the Netherlands, before his position at the University of Nottingham.

He was a member of the International Federation for Information Processing (IFIP) IFIP Working Group 2.1 on Algorithmic Languages and Calculi, which specified, maintains, and supports the programming languages ALGOL 60 and ALGOL 68.

Personal life
Backhouse is married to Hilary, née Mitchell. They have three sons, Kevin, Andrew, and David.

Academic interests
His research interests lie in the mathematics of program construction and algorithmic problem solving. Together with Jan L. A. van de Snepscheut (1953—1994), he began the biennial series of conferences on the Mathematics of Program Construction, the first of which was held in 1989.

References

Publications

Books

Books edited

Selected papers

External links
 
 The DBLP Computer Science Bibliography

1948 births
Living people
People from Middlesbrough
Alumni of Churchill College, Cambridge
Alumni of Imperial College London
Academics of the University of Nottingham
20th-century British mathematicians
21st-century British mathematicians